Nishan Connell Burkart (born 31 January 2000) is a Swiss professional footballer who plays as a centre-forward for Swiss Super League club Winterthur, on loan from SC Freiburg.

Club career
Burkart began his youth career with FC Zürich, before moving to the Manchester United youth academy in 2016. In 2019, he left Manchester United to join SC Freiburg II in Germany. He made his professional debut for SC Freiburg in the Bundesliga on 3 April 2021, coming on as a substitute in the 76th minute for Roland Sallai against Borussia Mönchengladbach. The away match finished as a 2–1 loss for Freiburg.

On 31 August 2022, Burkart moved on loan to Winterthur, with an option to buy.

International career
Burkart appeared for the Switzerland under-15 to under-20 youth national teams from 2014 to 2019. He is also eligible to represent England through his English mother.

Personal life
Burkart was born in Aarau, Switzerland. Both of his parents were Olympic sprinters. His father, Stefan Burkart, was a Swiss sprinter and sports coach who specialised in the 60 metres and 100 metres. His personal bests of 6.61 seconds and 10.32 seconds are former Swiss records for the events. At the 1996 Summer Olympics, Stefan became the oldest ever sprinter to compete in the men's 100 metres at the Olympics. His English-born mother, Helen Barnett, represented Great Britain at the 1984 Summer Olympics in the 400 metres and Switzerland at the 1992 Summer Olympics.

References

External links
 
 
 
 

2000 births
Living people
People from Aarau
Swiss men's footballers
Switzerland youth international footballers
English footballers
Swiss people of English descent
Association football forwards
FC Zürich players
Manchester United F.C. players
SC Freiburg II players
SC Freiburg players
FC Winterthur players
Bundesliga players
Regionalliga players
3. Liga players
Swiss expatriate footballers
Swiss expatriate sportspeople in Germany
English expatriate footballers
English expatriate sportspeople in Germany
Expatriate footballers in Germany
Sportspeople from Aargau